is a Japanese professional shogi player ranked 7-dan.

Early life
Fujiwara was born in Kobe on May 27, 1965.  He was accepted into the Japan Shogi Association's apprentice school at the rank of 6-kyū as a protegee of shogi professional  in 1979, and obtained full professional status and the rank of 4-dan in 1989.

Shogi professional
Fujiwara finished the finished the 75th Meijin Class C2 league (April 2016March 2017) with a record of 1 win and 9 losses, earning a third demotion point which meant automatic demotion to "Free Class" play.

Promotion history
The promotion history for Fujiwara is as follows:
 6-kyū: 1979
 1-dan: 1982
 4-dan: April 1, 1989
 5-dan: November 10, 1994
 6-dan: July 24, 2001
 7-dan: June 19, 2013

References

External links
ShogiHub: Professional Player Info · Fujiwara, Naoya

Japanese shogi players
Living people
Professional shogi players
People from Kobe
Professional shogi players from Hyōgo Prefecture
1965 births
Free class shogi players